The International Journal of Qualitative Studies on Health and Well-being is a quarterly peer-reviewed open access scientific journal covering the application of qualitative research to the study of health. It was established in 2006 and is published by Taylor & Francis. The editor-in-chief is Henrika Jormfeldt (Halmstad University). According to the Journal Citation Reports, the journal has a 2017 impact factor of 1.094, ranking it 114th out of 156 journals in the category "Public, Environmental & Occupational Health".

References

External links

Publications established in 2006
Taylor & Francis academic journals
Qualitative research journals
English-language journals
Quarterly journals
Public health journals
Open access journals